Anselm Hüttenbrenner (13 October 1794 – 5 June 1868) was an Austrian composer. He was on friendly terms with both Ludwig van Beethovenhe was one of only two people present at his deathand Franz Schubert, his recollections of whom constitute an interesting but probably unreliable document in Schubertian biographical studies.

Life
Hüttenbrenner was born in Graz, the son of a wealthy landowner.  He attended the Graz Lyzeum, and studied law at the University of Graz, but was also composing music at this time. Count Moritz von Fries (1777-1826) was impressed with his ability as a pianist, and following the Count's advice, Hüttenbrenner left in April 1815 for Vienna to study under Antonio Salieri. His first published works (for piano and Lieder) began to appear shortly afterwards, and the String Quartet (Op. 3) came out in 1816. He briefly returned to Graz in 1818, but was back in Vienna the following year, earning a living in a government office. In 1821 Hüttenbrenner inherited the family estate and married.

Years later, he visited Beethoven on his deathbed, who greeted him with the words "I am not worthy of your visiting me". He was also present on 26 March 1827, at the time of Beethoven's death, when the only other person present was Beethoven's housekeeper. In commemoration of the moment, Huttenbrenner cut a lock of Beethoven's hair, now in Graz together with Beethoven's family archival book in the Fux Conservatory.

Schubert sent the manuscript of his Unfinished Symphony to Hüttenbrenner, via Hüttenbrenner's brother Josef, around 1823. The manuscript remained with Hüttenbrenner until Johann Herbeck visited him in Ober-Andritz near Graz in 1865, and took the score away with him back to Vienna, where he conducted the first performance in December 1865. Hüttenbrenner held the post of director of the Steiermärkischer Musikverein from 1825 to 1829.  His Requiem in C minor was performed at Schubert's memorial service on 23 December 1828.

He was a follower of Jakob Lorber and from 1840 he participated actively in the transcription of what was allegedly dictated to Lorber by God. 

Hüttenbrenner died in Ober-Andritz at the age of 73.

Works, editions and recordings
Of Hüttenbrenner's works in manuscript, some are lost, but the majority remained with his descendants until their 2007 donation to the University Library of University of Music and Performing Arts Graz, Austria; they can be examined on site, with all items listed in the University Library's searchable online catalog. His works are considered very rich in melody, somewhat operatic.

27 sacred works, including 6 Masses and 3 Requiems
4 operas, including Lenore and Oedipus at Colonos
258 songs for voice and piano
133 quartets for male voices
159 choral works for male voices
20 orchestral works, including 2 symphonies
13 chamber works, including 2 string quartets and a string quintet
60 works for piano, 2 hands
23 works for piano, 4 hands
8 arrangements of other composers' works

Printed editions
 Songs for voice and piano, Vol. 1, edited by Ulf Bästlein, Alice and Michael Aschauer, 2008, Accolade Musikverlag (www.accolade.de): ACC.1209a
 Songs for voice and piano, Vol. 2, edited by Ulf Bästlein, Alice and Michael Aschauer, 2008, Accolade Musikverlag (www.accolade.de): ACC.1209b

Recordings
 Die innere Welt (Lieder); Ulf Bästlein (bass-baritone), Charles Spencer (piano), Gramola 2009

References

External links
 
 

1794 births
1868 deaths
19th-century Austrian people
19th-century classical composers
Franz Schubert
Composers from Graz
Austrian Romantic composers
String quartet composers